= Ferenc Fister =

Hungarian footballer

Personal information
- Date of birth: 23 February 1940 (age 86)
- Place of birth: Székesfehérvár, Hungary
- Position: Midfielder

International career
Years	Team	Apps	(Gls)
1965	Hungary	1	(0)

Ferenc Fister (born 23 February 1940) is a Hungarian footballer. He played in one match for the Hungary national football team in 1965.
